Wimpassing an der Leitha is a town in the district of Eisenstadt-Umgebung in the Austrian state of Burgenland.

Nearby municipalities 
 Wampersdorf (Lower Austrian municipality what has same word-root)
 Pottendorf
 Leithaprodersdorf
 Landegg

Population

References

Cities and towns in Eisenstadt-Umgebung District